Arosuka is a town and government seat of Solok Regency, of West Sumatra province of Indonesia. The Solok Regency is noted for its natural structures which have attracted tourists to the area. 

Populated places in West Sumatra
Regency seats of West Sumatra